Tetanocera ferruginea is a species of fly in the family Sciomyzidae. It is found in the  Palearctic
The larvae feed on Lymnaeidae and Planorbidae.

References

External links
Images representing Tetanocera ferruginea at BOLD
Ecology of Commanster

Sciomyzidae
Insects described in 1820
Diptera of Europe